Credito Cooperativo Ravennate, Forlivese e Imolese Società Cooperativa also known as La BCC Ravennate, Forlivese e Imolese is an Italian cooperative bank based in Faenza, Romagna region. The bank served towns around Faenza, Forlì, Lugo, Imola and Ravenna.

The bank is a member of Federazione Italiana delle Banche di Credito Cooperativo - Casse Rurali ed Artigiane (Federcasse) and Federazione delle Banche di Credito Cooperativo dell'Emilia-Romagna (16.0626%). The bank own a minority interests in ICCREA Holding (2.0019%).

History
Cassa Rurale ed Artigiana di Faenza was found in July 1955, as a rural credit union. In 1995 the bank was renamed into Credito Cooperativo Faenza.

In 1998 the bank merged with the cooperative bank of Lugo and Ravenna–Russi to form Credito Cooperativo Provincia di Ravenna. In 2002 the bank was renamed into Credito Cooperativo Ravennate e Imolese.

In October 2016 the boards of directors of Credito Cooperativo Ravennate e Imolese and Banca di Forlì Credito Cooperativo approved the merger of the two banks, which was approved by the Bank of Italy on 21 March 2017. On 24 March the registration of the new entity was completed.

References
Bilanci (in italian)

See also
 Banca del Monte e Cassa di Risparmio Faenza
 Cassa di Risparmio e Banca del Monte Lugo
 Cassa di Risparmio di Ravenna
 Cassa di Risparmio di Imola
 Cassa di Risparmio in Bologna
 Cassa di Risparmio di Cesena

External links
  

Cooperative banks of Italy
Companies based in the Province of Ravenna
Banks established in 1955
Italian companies established in 1955
Faenza